Ammapettai may refer to,

 Ammapettai (Erode district), a town in Erode district, Tamil Nadu, India
 Ammapettai, Salem, a town in Salem, Tamil Nadu, India
 Ammapettai (Thanjavur district), a town in Thanjavur district, Tamil Nadu